Trischistognatha ochritacta is a moth in the family Crambidae. It is found in Mexico.

The wingspan is about 27 mm. The forewings are shining olive brown. The hindwings are brownish semitranslucent with a black outer band.

References

Evergestinae